IC 2448 is an elliptical planetary nebula in the constellation of Carina. It was discovered in 1898 by Williamina Fleming. It lies near the bright star Beta Carinae, and the southern Carina can be explored in the months of autumn in the southern hemisphere. The central star of the planetary nebula is an O-type star with a spectral type of O(H)3 III-V. An analysis of Gaia data suggests that it is a binary system.

References

Notes

External links

http://www.skyfactory.org/deepskycatalogue/IC2448.html

Planetary nebulae
Carina (constellation)
4406